Tishreen Stadium is a multi-use stadium in al-Hasakah, Syria, currently used mostly for football matches. The capacity of the stadium is 9,000. The natural grass of the stadium was replaced with an artificial turf in 2011.

See also
List of football stadiums in Syria

Football venues in Syria